The Royal Navy mutiny of 1919 was a peaceful mutiny of several dozen sailors protesting against their deployment to the British campaign in the Baltic of 1918–19. Of all who left their ships 96 offenders were arrested and punished, ten by imprisonment.

Background
The British campaign in the Baltic 1918–19 was a part of the Allied intervention in the Russian Civil War. The codename of the Royal Navy campaign was "Operation Red Trek". The intervention played a key role in enabling the establishment of the independent states of Estonia and Latvia but failed to secure the control of Petrograd by White Russian forces, which was one of the main goals of the campaign. The action was unpopular with the men of the Royal Navy and earlier in the year on 13 January 1919, there was a mutiny on board  while the ship was docked at Milford Haven. Eight men were court-martialled on charges of non-violent mutiny and sentenced to 90 days and two years hard labour followed by dismissal.

Mutiny
When the men of the 1st Destroyer Flotilla found that they were going to be sent to the Baltic to take part in operations against the Russians, discussions took place about what options they had. The government had publicly pledged that only volunteers would be sent to take part in operations against the Russians. On 12 October 1919, a code phrase, "My name's Walker" was sent through the fleet signalling the start of the mutiny and 150 sailors left their posts preventing the 1st Destroyer Flotilla from leaving Port Edgar, Scotland. Almost 50 men then marched to London to present their petitions at the British government in Whitehall. Of all who left their ships 96 offenders were arrested and punished, ten by imprisonment.

Significant unrest took place among British sailors in the Baltic. The causes were a general war-weariness (many of the crews had fought in World War I), poor food and accommodation, a lack of leave and a developing sense of class consciousness.

Bibliography 
Notes

References 
 
 
   
  - Total pages: 373 
 
 

1919 labor disputes and strikes
Royal Navy mutinies
Labour disputes in the United Kingdom
1919 in the United Kingdom
20th-century military history of the United Kingdom
October 1919 events
November 1919 events
Mutinies in World War I